Fearne Wood ( Cotton; born 3 September 1981) is an English broadcaster and author. She began her career in the late 1990s presenting various children's television shows for GMTV, CITV and CBBC. In 2007, she presented The Xtra Factor, an ITV2 spin-off from the main show. Cotton presented Top of the Pops from 2004 to 2021 and some of the Red Nose Day and Children in Need telethons. From 2008 to 2018, she was a team captain on the ITV2 comedy panel show Celebrity Juice.

In 2007, Cotton became the first regular female presenter of the Radio 1 Chart Show, which she co-hosted with Reggie Yates for two years. She went on to present her own Radio 1 show, airing every weekday morning from 2009 to 2015. She joined BBC Radio 2 in 2016.

In 2018, Cotton began presenting Happy Place, a podcast available to online streaming platforms. She has also released eight self-help books, two  children's books, and four books on healthy eating.

Early life
Cotton was born in Northwood, London Borough of Hillingdon, to Mick and Lyn Cotton; she has a younger brother, Jamie Cotton. Her father was a signwriter for events such as Live Aid, and her mother worked in alternative therapy. She grew up in nearby Eastcote, and was educated at Haydon School. She is a pescetarian and an animal lover. She has participated in several half marathons for charity. Former BBC executive Bill Cotton (1928–2008) was her paternal grandfather's cousin. He was the son of the well-known entertainer and band leader Billy Cotton. In August 2017, Cotton's ancestry was explored in the BBC TV series Who Do You Think You Are?

Cotton studied art at A-level, a skill she used whilst presenting the series Draw Your Own Toons.

Television

Children's
Cotton began her presenting career in 1996, at the age of 15, with early-morning GMTV children's programme The Disney Club, after winning a competition for young talent to present the show. Cotton later continued with the show and with its replacement Diggit. She left in 2000, to concentrate on her other projects with CITV, including Draw Your Own Toons and Mouse, aimed at encouraging children to use computers.

Cotton joined CBBC in 2001 to present children's science programme Eureka TV. From 2001 until 2003, she presented Finger Tips, an arts and crafts programme for children, which she co-presented with Stephen Mulhern. She later co-presented on CBBC's Sunday morning show, Smile and on The Saturday Show. She has also made appearances in the CBBC show Only in America, alongside her good friend and fellow presenter Reggie Yates. Cotton returned to children's television in 2015 by voicing one of the Voice Trumpets in the reboot of the classic British children's television series Teletubbies.

ITV
In 2006, Cotton presented the second series of ITV's Love Island with Patrick Kielty.

In 2007, she took over from Ben Shephard as host of The X Factor spin-off programme The Xtra Factor on ITV2, presenting the programme for one series before resigning to work in America; she was replaced in the following series by Holly Willoughby.

Starting on 5 September 2007, Cotton co-hosted with Holly Willoughby the ITV2 dating programme Holly & Fearne Go Dating, which saw the pair try to find dates for lonely singletons.

Beginning in 2008, Cotton appeared as a team captain on the ITV2 comedy panel show Celebrity Juice alongside host Keith Lemon and fellow team captain Holly Willoughby. Cotton took a short break from the programme in 2013 whilst on maternity leave, and Kelly Brook stood in for her during the ninth series. She quit the series in 2018.

Cotton has also presented the Isle of Wight Festival 2009 on ITV2 alongside Rufus Hound.

Since 2009, Cotton has hosted Fearne and... on ITV2. In 2012, Cotton hosted The Nation's Favourite Number One Single, a three-part series, revealing Britain's Favourite No. 1 single. Since 2016, Cotton has co-presented Fearne & Gok: Off The Rails, alongside Gok Wan for ITVBe. In March 2017, Cotton guest presented five episodes of ITV Breakfast's Lorraine programme.

BBC
In 2003, Cotton moved over to mainstream broadcasting. She along with Simon Grant (her co-presenter from The Saturday Show) presented the spin-off show Top of the Pops: Saturday (later renamed Top of the Pops: Reloaded) that year. In 2004, she moved up to work alongside Reggie Yates on the main programme, Top of the Pops (the then flagship chartshow for the BBC) becoming one of the last regular presenters for that programme, which ended in July 2006. Due to other commitments, she was unable to present the final show itself, appearing instead in a short film shown at the head of that show, in which she made her personal farewells. Cotton and Yates presented the one-off Christmas and New Year specials in both 2008 and 2009, as well as the Comic Relief special in 2009.

She has hosted parts of the Red Nose Day telethon for Comic Relief (2005, 2007, 2009 and 2011) presenting several strands alongside Jonathan Ross and Lenny Henry.

Cotton has also presented many charity telethons for both Comic Relief and Children in Need on BBC One and BBC Two. In July 2005 she co-presented the BBC's coverage of Live 8 in Hyde Park. During the event, British pop star and former Take That member Robbie Williams flirted with her in front of the cameras, causing much speculation in the media at the time, but which was later repudiated by the pair. In 2008, she hosted a Strictly Come Dancing special as part of Children in Need.

In June 2012, Cotton was one of the BBC's presenters for its coverage of the Thames Diamond Jubilee Pageant. Following more than 4,000 complaints made about the BBC's coverage of the Diamond Jubilee in 2012 and in particular criticism of Cotton's role, she responded on Twitter by stating, "Grown men who slag me off in articles/online are huge bullies. I love my job and wouldn't be doing it if I wasn't any good at it."

Cotton guest presented The One Show on BBC One for two nights in November 2013, two nights in February 2014, one night in March 2014 and one night in March 2016.

Other channels
She also presented the Friday night live eviction programme that year for the Channel 5 reality television series Make Me a Supermodel.

Cotton hosted Sky1's talent search Must Be The Music for one series in 2010.

Commercials

Cotton is the voice over of the Tesco Mobile adverts since late 2020. She also became the voice over of the On the Beach radio adverts in 2022.

United States
In 2008, Cotton moved to the US to host The Guinness Book of Records – Live. Cotton later co-hosted the NBC reality show Last Comic Standing.

Eurovision Song Contest
Cotton has presented parts of the BBC's coverage of the Eurovision Song Contest.

On 20 May 2006, she read the United Kingdom's votes at the Eurovision Song Contest 2006, held in Athens, Greece.

On 17 March 2007, she, along with Terry Wogan, hosted Making Your Mind Up 2007, the show to decide which song the UK sent to the Eurovision Song Contest 2007 in Helsinki, Finland. On the night, after the final "sing-off" between the two remaining acts, Wogan and Cotton simultaneously announced different winners. Since Wogan was the more experienced presenter, it was assumed that he was right. In fact, Wogan had accidentally announced the wrong artist, Cyndi, as the winner. Cotton had to persist in repeating the correct name until the confusion was resolved. The group Scooch was quickly proclaimed as the correct winner but came only second from bottom in the main competition, just avoiding Nil Points. Cotton also presented the United Kingdom's votes at the show itself, held in Helsinki, Finland, on 12 May 2007.

Radio

BBC Radio 1
In September 2005, she joined BBC Radio 1 to present the Friday early morning slot with Reggie Yates, with whom she had previously worked on CBBC, Only in America and Top of the Pops. Since 14 October 2007, Cotton and Yates presented BBC Radio 1's Chart Show, taking over from JK & Joel, who had left the station. Cotton then became the first ever permanent female presenter of a BBC radio chart show. (Jo Whiley had preceded her as the first female presenter of The Official UK Top 40, as it was then called, but presented it only once, on 24 November 2002.)

On 16 July 2009, it was announced that Cotton would become the new presenter of BBC Radio 1's weekday mid-morning show, taking over from Jo Whiley (who moved to weekends). Her new programme began on 21 September 2009.

On 27 February 2015, she announced that she was pregnant with her second child and that she would be leaving BBC Radio 1. Clara Amfo replaced Cotton on 25 May 2015, taking over the mid-morning show. Cotton's final show was broadcast on 22 May 2015.

BBC Radio 2
Cotton joined BBC Radio 2 in July 2016 standing in for Graham Norton with former Spandau Ballet bassist Martin Kemp on Saturday mornings (10 am–1 pm) while Norton took his annual summer break. Fearne covered for Ken Bruce 24–28 October 2016, in 2017 on 13–17 February, 3–7 and 10–14 April, 11 May, 29 May–2 June and 23–27 October, and in 2018 on 14–16 February.
Fearne has also covered for Chris Evans on the Breakfast Show from 9–13 April 2018. In late 2018, Cotton sat in for Claudia Winkleman on Sundays.

In 2019, Cotton was the cover host for Zoe Ball during the holidays. On 19 March 2020 Cotton launched BBC Radio 2's fourth music decades show, Sounds of the 90s.

Other work
In August 2017, Cotton collaborated with Mini Club, a children's clothing company that sells through Boots stores and their website, to produce her own clothing range. She publicised the range across her various social media accounts, posting pictures of herself and her daughter wearing lines from the collection. She also has clothing and homeware ranges with online retailer Very.

In 2018, Cotton began presenting Happy Place, a podcast available to streaming platforms. The podcast features Cotton interviewing different celebrities.

Personal life
Cotton said on Friday Night with Jonathan Ross that she has eleven tattoos over her body, the most notable of which is a fern leaf, covering her right hip up to her rib cage.

Cotton is married to Jesse Wood, the son of Rolling Stones guitarist Ronnie Wood. On 8 August 2012, Cotton announced she was pregnant with her first child. On 21 February 2013, she announced on Twitter that she had given birth that morning to a son, Rex Rayne Wood. Wood and Cotton were married in July 2014. On 27 February 2015, Cotton announced that she was expecting her second child as part of her announcement that she was leaving BBC Radio 1, to start a new chapter. On 9 September 2015, she announced on Twitter that she had given birth that morning to a daughter, Honey Krissy Wood.

Cotton is a friend of fellow TV presenter Holly Willoughby, with whom she has co-presented several shows. Cotton and Sarah Cawood acted as two of the bridesmaids at Willoughby's wedding to Dan Baldwin on 4 August 2007. Cotton is a pescatarian. Cotton is not vegan but in 2019 authored a vegan cookbook.

Charity
Cotton supports a number of charities including CoppaFeel!, Post Pals, Macmillan Cancer Support, Children in Need and Red Nose Day.

In 2009, she climbed Mount Kilimanjaro, alongside Ben Shephard, Gary Barlow, Alesha Dixon, Ronan Keating, Denise Van Outen and Chris Moyles, and Girls Aloud members Cheryl Cole and Kimberley Walsh. Cotton and others collapsed from altitude sickness during the five-day climb. She was in the first group (with Van Outen, Shephard and Cole) to reach the summit and helped raise £3.3m. Cotton filmed a video piece for Comic Relief about malaria. She visited a children's hospital in Uganda where she witnessed a young child in pain through malaria. Cotton had to walk out of the room and collapsed as she did so but was able to continue shortly after. The child died later. Cotton also recorded her voice for the BT Speaking Clock to raise funds for Comic Relief.

Filmography

Television

Film

Bibliography 
The Best Friends' Guide to Life (14 October 2010) – with Holly Willoughby
Cook Happy, Cook Healthy (2 June 2016)
Happy: Finding joy in every day and letting go of perfect (9 February 2017)
Yoga Babies (31 May 2017)
Cook. Eat. Love (1 June 2017)
Calm: Working through life's daily stresses to find a peaceful centre (28 December 2017)
Hungry Babies (6 September 2018)
Quiet: Silencing The brain chatter and believing you are good enough (13 December 2018)
Happy Vegan: Easy plant-based recipes to make the whole family happy (3 October 2019)
Speak your Truth (7 January 2021)
Bigger Than Us: The power of finding meaning in a messy world (20 January 2022)

References

External links
 
 Sounds of the 90s with Fearne Cotton (BBC Radio 2)
 
 Pictures of Fearne
 Fearne by Fearne Cotton for Mini Club

1981 births
Living people
BBC Radio 1 presenters
BBC Radio 2 presenters
British radio presenters
British television presenters
English women non-fiction writers
GMTV presenters and reporters
People educated at Haydon School
People from Northwood, London
People from Ruislip
Vegan cookbook writers
British women radio presenters
Top of the Pops presenters